Nicole L. Franklin is an American filmmaker, activist, writer and media professional. She founded Hack4Hope, a hackathon in St. Louis.
Franklin writes for The Good Men Project, Toronto publication ByBlacks.com and NBCBLK.

Biography
Since 1999, her company EPIPHANY Inc. has been producing independent films for numerous cable networks including Showtime, BET, IFC, Nickelodeon, Sundance Channel, The Documentary Channel, FUBU TV, and now kweliTV. Her credits include The Double Dutch Divas!, Journeys In Black: the Jamie Foxx Biography, Kids Around the World, NBC Nightly News, The Today Show, Black Enterprise Business Report, and CBS News. Her current educational films include Gershwin & Bess: A Dialogue with Anne Brown and the 10-chapter series Little Brother, both titles distributed by Third World Newsreel. Little Brother airs on FUBU TV. Little Brother is a recipient of the Foundation to Promote Open Society/Campaign for Black Male Achievement Award, fiscally sponsored by Fractured Atlas.

Awards
 Best Documentary, Atlanta's Night of the Black Independents
 Best Documentary, Hollywood Black Film Festival
 Best African-American Documentary, Brooklyn Film Festival
 CiNY Award for Outstanding Filmmaking, Cinewomen NY 
 Gordon Parks Award Finalist for Directing a Feature 
 Honorable Mention, Black Filmmakers Hall of Fame Filmworks 
 Audience Award, African-American Women in Cinema Conference and Festival 
 First Runner Up, First Annual Original Action Shero Film Festival Brooklyn, NY 
 Inspirational Documentary Award, Riverrun Film Festival Asheville, NC
 Honorable Mention, Women of Color Film Festival New York, NY
 Community Service Award, African American Leadership Initiative (AALI) of the United Way of Greater Union County
 Juror's Choice Certificate, The Brooklyn Chapter of the Links "Salute to Youth" 12th Annual Women of African Descent Film Festival
 Citation from Councilmember Jumaane D. Williams (Brooklyn, NY) for "outstanding citizen" who gives "exemplary service to their communities" (2012, 2013)
Daytime Entertainment Emmy Award, Video Editor, CBS Sunday Morning The National Academy of Television Arts and Sciences (2012-2013)
 Daytime Entertainment Emmy Award, Video Editor, CBS Sunday Morning The National Academy of Television Arts and Sciences (2014-2015)

References

Living people
African-American activists
African-American writers
African-American women writers
American women writers
African-American women journalists
African-American journalists
African-American film directors
American film directors
African-American film producers
American film producers
American women film producers
Year of birth missing (living people)
21st-century African-American people
21st-century African-American women